Peter Hansen (born 2 June 1941 in Aalborg), a Danish national, was commissioner-general of the United Nations Relief and Works Agency for Palestine Refugees in the Near East (UNRWA) from 1996 to 2005.

Academic career
After completing graduate and postgraduate studies in political science at Aarhus University in 1966, Hansen joined the staff of the university as an assistant professor in international relations.

Diplomatic career
In 1978, Hansen joined the United Nations as assistant secretary-general for programme planning and coordination. Between 1985 and 1992, he served as assistant secretary-general and executive director of the United Nations Centre on Transnational Corporations. In March 1994, he took over the post of Undersecretary-General for Humanitarian Affairs and Emergency Relief Coordinator.

During his UN tenure, he has served as chairman of the organization's appointment and promotion board and various committees and as the secretary-general's representative to the World Food Programme. He also served as the special representative of the secretary-general to the ad hoc liaison committee established to follow up the Washington Conference in support of the Middle East peace process.

Commissioner-general of UNRWA
Hansen was appointed commissioner-general of UNRWA by UN Secretary-General Boutros Boutros-Ghali on 20 January 1996 and took office on 1 March 1996. His term ended on 31 March  2005 and he retired from United Nations service. Hansen had been critical of Israeli actions, and UN sources said the US had opposed his reappointment.

See also
 List of Directors and Commissioners-General of the United Nations Relief and Works Agency for Palestine Refugees in the Near East

References

 

1941 births
Living people
20th-century Danish diplomats
21st-century Danish diplomats
UNRWA officials
Under-Secretaries-General of the United Nations
Aarhus University alumni
Academic staff of Aarhus University
Danish officials of the United Nations
People from Aalborg